Thanarat Saengphet (born 19 August 2002) is a Thai boxer. He participated at the 2021 AIBA World Boxing Championships, being awarded the bronze medal in the flyweight event.

References

External links 

2002 births
Living people
Place of birth missing (living people)
Thanarat Saengphet
Flyweight boxers
AIBA World Boxing Championships medalists